St. Clairsville may refer to:
 St. Clairsville, Ohio
 St. Clairsville, Pennsylvania